The Comet Interceptor is a robotic spacecraft mission led by the European Space Agency (ESA) planned for launch in 2029. The spacecraft will be "parked" at the Sun-Earth L2 point and wait for up to three years for a long-period comet to fly by at a reachable trajectory and speed.

The Principal Investigator is Geraint Jones, from the Mullard Space Science Laboratory in the United Kingdom. The maximum cost of the spacecraft bus is set at €150M, excluding science instruments and launch services.

Overview

Long-period comets have highly eccentric orbits and periods ranging from 200 years to millions of years, so they are usually discovered only months before they pass through the inner Solar System and return to the distant reaches of the outer Solar System, which is too little time to plan and launch a mission. Therefore, ESA will "park" the Comet Interceptor spacecraft on a stable halo orbit around the Sun-Earth L2 point and wait for the discovery of a suitable comet that it can reach for a close flyby.

The Comet Interceptor mission is unique in that it is designed to encounter an as-yet unknown target, having to wait between 2 and 3 years for a target it can reach with a reasonable change in velocity (delta-v) within a total mission length of approximately 5 years. The baseline design is solar electric propulsion. 

Finding a suitable comet to fly by will rely on ground-based observational surveys such as Pan-STARRS, ATLAS, or the future Large Synoptic Survey Telescope (LSST). In the case that no long-period comet can be intercepted in time, a backup short period comet (baseline: 73P/Schwassmann–Wachmann) can be studied. There is also the potential of intercepting an interstellar object passing through the Solar System, if the velocity and direction permit.
 
The mission's primary science goal is stated as "to characterise, a dynamically-new comet, including its surface composition, shape, structure, and the composition of its gas coma."

Comet Interceptor is being developed as ESA's first Fast class (F-class) of the Cosmic Vision programme. The mission is being planned and developed by a consortium that includes the ESA and Japan's space agency JAXA. Comet Interceptor will share the launch vehicle with ESA's ARIEL space telescope, which is also bound for Lagrange point 2.

Secondary spacecraft

A few weeks before the comet flyby, the main spacecraft (spacecraft A) will deploy two small probes (B1 and B2) to venture even closer to the target, carrying complementary instrument payloads and to sample the coma. Each of the three spacecraft will sample gas composition, dust flux, density, magnetic fields, and plasma and solar wind interactions, to build up a 3D profile of the region around the comet.

See also 

 ARIEL – Launching on the same rocket

References

Missions to comets
European Space Agency space probes
2029 in spaceflight
Cosmic Vision
Proposed space probes